Top Gun: Maverick is a 2022 American action drama film directed by Joseph Kosinski and written by Ehren Kruger, Eric Warren Singer, and Christopher McQuarrie from a story by Peter Craig and Justin Marks. The sequel to Top Gun (1986), it stars Tom Cruise, Val Kilmer, Miles Teller, Jennifer Connelly, Jon Hamm, Glen Powell, Lewis Pullman, and Ed Harris. In the film, Captain  Pete "Maverick" Mitchell (Cruise) confronts his past while training a group of younger Top Gun graduates, including the son of his deceased best friend, for a dangerous mission.

Top Gun: Maverick premiered at CinemaCon on April 28, 2022, and was released in the United States on May 27. Made on a production budget of $170million, Maverick grossed $1.493billion, finishing its theatrical run as the second-highest-grossing film of 2022 and the highest-grossing film of Cruise's career. On the review aggregator website Rotten Tomatoes, the film holds an approval rating of  based on  reviews.

The film has received various awards and nominations. Top Gun: Maverick garnered two Golden Globe nominations at the 80th ceremony. It received six nominations at the 95th Academy Awards, including Best Picture, Best Adapted Screenplay, Best Original Song, Best Film Editing, and Best Visual Effects; and won for Best Sound. In addition to two National Board of Review Awards, it was named one of the ten best films of 2022 by the American Film Institute. The film won three of five nominations at the 47th Saturn Awards.

Accolades

Notes

References

External links
 

Lists of accolades by film
Top Gun